Kasper Hjulmand (born 9 April 1972) is a Danish football manager and a former player. He is the head coach for the Denmark national team, with whom he reached the semi-finals of Euro 2020.

Playing career
A defender, Hjulmand began his career with Randers Freja in 1987 where he played four years, and then signed with Herlev IF in the winter of 1992. He played with Herlev IF two seasons and then moved to B.93 in the winter of 1995. He also played for the North Florida Ospreys in 1994, scoring six goals in 18 appearances.
After three seasons with B93 at the age of 26 Hjulmand was forced to retire as a football player due to a knee injury.

Coaching career

Early career
Hjulmand became head coach of Lyngby from 1 January 2006 until 7 July 2008 when he became an assistant coach with FC Nordsjælland. He was named the successor of Morten Wieghorst at FC Nordsjælland taking over from 1 July 2011 until 18 May 2014 when he had his final match as head coach of Nordsjælland; a 2–2 draw against Brøndby. Nordsjælland won their first Danish championship with Hjulmand as head coach.

Mainz 05
On 15 May 2014, Hjulmand was confirmed as Thomas Tuchel's successor at 1. FSV Mainz 05 for the following season. His first two matches in charge was in the Third qualifying round of the Europa League. In the first leg against Asteras Tripoli, Mainz won 1–0, and in the second leg, Mainz lost 3–1 and they got knocked out of the campaign. Then Mainz were knocked out in the first round of the DFB Cup after losing to Chemnitzer FC in a shoot–out. In his first eight league matches, Mainz were undefeated and in third place. After this, Mainz had won only one of their 13 matches and dropped down to 14th place. At this point, on 17 February 2015, he was sacked. His final match was a 4–2 loss to Borussia Dortmund.

Return to Nordsjælland
On 15 December 2015, it was announced that Hjulmand would return as manager of Nordsjælland as of 1 January 2016. Hjulmand managed to get the team back on track and the club finished 9th in the 2015–16 Danish Superliga. In the following two seasons he led Nordsjælland to a sixth and third place. In January 2019, Hjulmand was linked with RSC Anderlecht, but Nordsjælland wanted a compensation that Anderlecht did not want to pay and instead Fred Rutten was appointed. Following the failed contract with Anderlecht Hjulmand announced that he would leave Nordsjælland in the summer of 2019 at the end of his contract.

On 25 March 2019, Hjulmand left Nordsjælland by mutual consent after having secured a spot in the Championship round of the 2018–19 Danish Superliga.

Denmark national team
In June 2019, it was announced that Hjulmand would replace Åge Hareide as manager of the Denmark national football team, when Hareide's contract expired after the UEFA Euro 2020 tournament. Hareide did not lead the team at the Euro 2020, since the tournament was postponed due to the COVID-19 pandemic. In the Euro 2020, he led Denmark to reach the semi-finals, in which they lost 2–1 after extra-time and a controversial penalty against England. He later led Denmark to finish second in their group in the 2022–23 UEFA Nations League A, only one point behind Croatia. In the 2022 FIFA World Cup, Denmark finished last in their group with one draw and two defeats, in which they scored only once in the tournament.

Coaching record

Honours

Managerial
Lyngby
 Danish 1st Division: 2006–07

Nordsjælland
 Danish Superliga: 2011–12

References

1972 births
Living people
Sportspeople from Aalborg
Danish men's footballers
Association football defenders
Boldklubben af 1893 players
Randers FC players
Herlev IF players
North Florida Ospreys men's soccer players
Danish football managers
Danish expatriate football managers
Expatriate football managers in Germany
Lyngby Boldklub managers
FC Nordsjælland managers
1. FSV Mainz 05 managers
Denmark national football team managers
UEFA Euro 2020 managers
Danish Superliga managers
Bundesliga managers
Danish 1st Division managers
2022 FIFA World Cup managers